In Greek mythology, Hemera was the personification of day. According to Hesiod, she was the daughter of Erebus (Darkness) and Nyx (Night), and the sister of Aether. Though separate entities in Hesiod's Theogony, Hemera and Eos (Dawn) were often identified with each other.

Genealogy 
In Hesiod's Theogony, Hemera and her brother Aether were the offspring of Erebus and Nyx. Bacchylides apparently had Hemera as the daughter of Chronus (Time) and Nyx. In the lost epic poem the Titanomachy (late seventh century BC?), Hemera was perhaps the mother, by Aether, of Uranus (Sky). In some rare versions, Hemera was instead the daughter of Helios (the Sun) by an unknown mother.

Mythology 
According to Hesiod's Theogony, Hemera left Tartarus just as Nyx (Night) entered it; when Hemera returned, Nyx left:

Roman counterpart Dies 
Hemera's Roman counterpart Dies (Day) had a different genealogy. According to the Roman mythographer Hyginus, Chaos and Caligio (Mist) were the parents of Nox (Night), Dies, Erebus, and Aether. Cicero says that Aether and Dies were the parents of Caelus (Sky). While, Hyginus says that, in addition to  Caelus, Aether and Dies were also the parents of Terra (Earth), and Mare (Sea). Cicero also says that  Dies and Caelus were the parents of Mercury, the Roman counterpart of Hermes.

Identified with Eos 
Although Eos (Dawn) is a separate entity in Hesiod's Theogony—where she is the daughter of the Titans Theia and Hyperion, the mother of Memnon, and the lover of Cephalus—elsewhere Eos and Hemera are identified. For example, the geographer Pausanias describes seeing depictions, on the "Royal Portico" at Athens and on the throne of Apollo at Amyclae, of Cephalus being carried off by a goddess whom he identifies as Hemera. He also describes a stone pedestal at Olympia which depicted Hemera pleading with Zeus for the life of her son Memnon. Similarly, although, in Homer's Odyssey, Eos is said to be the abductor of Orion, a scholiast on that passage says that, according to Euphorion, Hemera fell in love with Orion and carried him away.

Worship 
There's little evidence of Hemera having received a cult in ancient times, however archaeological evidence has proven the existence of a small shrine to Hemera and Helios, the god of the sun, on the island of Kos.

Notes

References 
 Apollodorus, Apollodorus, The Library, with an English Translation by Sir James George Frazer, F.B.A., F.R.S. in 2 Volumes. Cambridge, Massachusetts, Harvard University Press; London, William Heinemann Ltd. 1921. . Online version at the Perseus Digital Library.
 Campbell, David A., Greek Lyric, Volume IV: Bacchylides, Corinna,  Loeb Classical Library No. 461. Cambridge, Massachusetts, Harvard University Press, 1992. . Online version at Harvard University Press.
 Cicero, Marcus Tullius, De Natura Deorum in Cicero: On the Nature of the Gods. Academics, translated by H. Rackham, Loeb Classical Library No. 268, Cambridge, Massachusetts, Harvard University Press, first published 1933, revised 1951. . Online version at Harvard University Press.  Internet Archive.
 Euripides, Andromache in Euripides: Children of Heracles. Hippolytus. Andromache. Hecuba, edited and translated by David Kovacs, Loeb Classical Library No. 484. Cambridge, Massachusetts, Harvard University Press, 1995. . Online version at Harvard University Press.
 Farnell, Lewis Richard, The Cults of the Greek States vol 5, Clarendon Press Oxford, 1909. Internet Archive.
 Gantz, Timothy, Early Greek Myth: A Guide to Literary and Artistic Sources, Johns Hopkins University Press, 1996, Two volumes:  (Vol. 1),  (Vol. 2).
 Grimal, Pierre, The Dictionary of Classical Mythology, Wiley-Blackwell, 1996, .
 Hard, Robin, The Routledge Handbook of Greek Mythology: Based on H.J. Rose's "Handbook of Greek Mythology", Psychology Press, 2004, . Google Books.
 Hesiod, Theogony, in Hesiod, Theogony, Works and Days, Testimonia, Edited and translated by Glenn W. Most. Loeb Classical Library No. 57. Cambridge, Massachusetts, Harvard University Press, 2018. . Online version at Harvard University Press.
 Homer, The Odyssey with an English Translation by A.T. Murray, PH.D. in two volumes. Cambridge, Massachusetts, Harvard University Press; London, William Heinemann, Ltd. 1919. Online version at the Perseus Digital Library.
 Hyginus, Gaius Julius, Fabulae in Apollodorus' Library and Hyginus' Fabulae: Two Handbooks of Greek Mythology, Translated, with Introductions by R. Scott Smith and Stephen M. Trzaskoma, Hackett Publishing Company,  2007. .
 Lightfoot, J. L., Hellenistic Collection: Philitas, Alexander of Aetolia, Hermesianax, Euphorion, Parthenius, edited and translated by J. L. Lightfoot, Loeb Classical Library No. 508, Cambridge, Massachusetts, Harvard University Press, 2010. . Online version at Harvard University Press.
 Ovid. Metamorphoses, Volume I: Books 1-8. Translated by Frank Justus Miller. Revised by G. P. Goold. Loeb Classical Library No. 42. Cambridge, Massachusetts: Harvard University Press, 1977, first published 1916. . Online version at Harvard University Press.
 Pausanias, Pausanias Description of Greece with an English Translation by W.H.S. Jones, Litt.D., and H.A. Ormerod, M.A., in 4 Volumes. Cambridge, Massachusetts, Harvard University Press; London, William Heinemann Ltd. 1918. Online version at the Perseus Digital Library.
 Tripp, Edward, Crowell's Handbook of Classical Mythology, Thomas Y. Crowell Co; First edition (June 1970). .
 West, M. L. (2002), "'Eumelos': A Corinthian Epic Cycle?" in The Journal of Hellenic Studies, vol. 122, pp. 109–133. .
 West, M. L. (2003), Greek Epic Fragments: From the Seventh to the Fifth Centuries BC, edited and translated by Martin L. West, Loeb Classical Library No. 497, Cambridge, Massachusetts, Harvard University Press, 2003.  . Online version at Harvard University Press.

External links 
 
 HEMERA from the Theoi Project

Day
Greek goddesses
Personifications in Greek mythology
Greek primordial deities
Children of Helios
Children of Nyx
Personifications